Cañar may refer to:

 Cañar Province, Ecuador
 Cáñar, Spain
 Canar (service provider), Sudan